Nogometno društvo Slovenj Gradec or simply ND Slovenj Gradec is a Slovenian football club based in the town of Slovenj Gradec.

Honours
Slovenian Fifth Division
 Winners: 2008–09

References

Association football clubs established in 2004
Football clubs in Slovenia
2004 establishments in Slovenia